Teatro Margherita is a former theatre in the city of Bari, Apulia on the east coast of Italy. Its predecessor, a wooden structure called Varietà Margherita opened on September 5, 1910. From 1912–1914, a new theatre was erected by architect Francesco De Giglio. It opened in 1914. 

The Teatro Margherita was used as a theatre and cinema until 1979. It is used as a museum now.

References

1910 establishments in Italy
Buildings and structures in Bari
Margherita
Margherita
Theatres completed in 1914